Jesper Olesen (born 13 October 1980) is a Danish professional football player, who currently plays for Vejle Boldklub in the Danish Superliga. Olesen, who has played in Vejle since 1996, is known as a fighter, which he has proved several times by always regaining his position on the right back even though supplements have been brought in from other clubs.  In his career in Vejle he has been playing as a semi-professional while finishing his education as a carpenter.

Olesens contract with the club is running until 30 June 2009.

References

External links
  Vejle Boldklub profile

1980 births
Living people
Danish men's footballers
Vejle Boldklub players

Association football defenders